Haymount District, also known as Haymount Historic District, is a national historic district located at Fayetteville, Cumberland County, North Carolina.  It encompasses 60 contributing buildings and 1 contributing site in a primarily residential section of Fayetteville.  The dwellings were built between about 1817 and 1950, and include notable examples of Queen Anne and Colonial Revival style architecture.  The earliest extant residence is the Robert Strange Town House (c. 1817), home of Senator Robert Strange (1796-1854). Another notable building is the Highsmith Memorial Hospital, designed by architect Charles C. Hartmann and completed in 1926. Also located in the district is the separately listed Edgar Allan Poe House.

It was listed on the National Register of Historic Places in 1983, with a boundary increase in 2007.

References

Historic districts on the National Register of Historic Places in North Carolina
Queen Anne architecture in North Carolina
Colonial Revival architecture in North Carolina
Buildings and structures in Fayetteville, North Carolina
National Register of Historic Places in Cumberland County, North Carolina